KVC Health Systems, Inc. (KVC) is a private, nonprofit child welfare and behavioral healthcare organization. When Kansas became the first U.S. state to privatize its child welfare services in 1996, it selected KVC to be one of the nonprofit service providers. As of 2021, KVC Kansas is the only nonprofit organization that has continually been a foster care case management provider for 25 years KVC has provided foster care case management services longer than any other private organization in the U.S.

Since its founding in 1970, KVC has grown since from a single home for at-risk boys in Kansas to a national organization serving 60,000 children and families in the United States. KVC uses evidence-based research to achieve better outcomes and advance child welfare.

History 
What is now KVC Health Systems started in 1970 as Wyandotte House in Wyandotte County, Kansas. B. Wayne Sims was hired in 1980 as president and CEO. He contributed some of the organization's guiding philosophies including, “What would you want for your child?” and “There is no magic answer down the street."   He retired at the end of 2015, completing 35 years as KVC's president and CEO. The current CEO is Jason Hooper.

When the state of Kansas became the first state to privatize child welfare services in 1996, KVC was selected as one of the contractors. In 2021, KVC remains the only original case management provider who has provided that service continually for 25 years. These services are provided through subsidiary KVC Kansas, also known as KVC Behavioral HealthCare. An August 2013 visit to Kansas by a delegation from Singapore's government attests to KVC's success in improving outcomes for vulnerable children.

Overview 
KVC provides services for children and families including in-home family support, foster care, adoption, behavioral healthcare, and inpatient children's psychiatric treatment.

The organization has been accredited by The Joint Commission since 1991.

KVC Health Systems is the parent organization of subsidiaries including:
KVC Kansas (also known as KVC Behavioral HealthCare)
KVC Hospitals with treatment centers in Kansas City, Wichita and Hays
KVC Missouri (also known as KVC Behavioral HealthCare Missouri) which includes KVC Niles
KVC Nebraska (also known as KVC Behavioral HealthCare Nebraska)
KVC West Virginia (also known as KVC Behavioral HealthCare West Virginia)
KVC Kentucky  (also known as KVC Behavioral HealthCare Kentucky)
KVC Foundation

State and federal agencies as well as international governments often call on KVC Health Systems to provide consulting on how to improve child welfare.

Partnerships 

Dr. Glenn Saxe, director of The Child Study Center at New York University's Langone Medical Center, has worked with KVC to adapt his Trauma Systems Therapy (TST) approach to the foster care community. This aims to equip foster parents to better support children who have experienced trauma such as abuse or neglect.

KVC Health Systems partnered with the Annie E. Casey Foundation, Child Trends, and the Child Study Center at New York University to conduct a five-year study of integrating trauma-informed care into the child welfare system. The study found that the implementation of TST throughout the entire agency was successful and created positive results for children. Children exposed to TST showed measurable improvements in functioning, behavior regulation and placement stability (which means not moving from foster family to foster family). Within the first three months of exposure to trauma-informed care, children also showed improvements in emotional regulation. Finally, staff reported higher levels of effectiveness with children based on concerted care using an integrated, multi-disciplinary approach grounded in a common language and shared interventions.

Sesame Street in Communities has partnered with KVC Health Systems to help bring resources to children and families in the Kansas City, KS area. This partnership will allow for KVC to train our employees and share with the families we serve on how to best help children deal with difficult topics like grief, traumatic experiences and others.

Notes

External links 
 KVC Health Systems website
Guidestar profile for KVC Health Systems
 CareerBuilder page for KVC Health Systems
 NYU Langone Medical Center - KVC's Use of Trauma Systems Therapy
 Video of KVC President/CEO Wayne Sims on the history of KVC
 Kansas City Royals' James Shields and KU Coach Bill Self Help KVC Kids in Foster Care
 Kansas City Royals' Big Game James Section for KVC Kids in Foster Care

Medical and health organizations based in Kansas